Mai Jianpeng (born 2 July 1989) is a Chinese para-badminton player.

In 2021, Mai won a gold medal representing China in the men's doubles WH1–WH2 event of the 2020 Summer Paralympics.

Achievements

Paralympic Games
Men's doubles WH1–WH2

World Championships 
Men's doubles

Mixed doubles

Asian Para Games 

Men's singles

Men's doubles

Mixed doubles

Asian Championships 
Men's singles

International Tournaments (6 titles) 
Men's doubles

Mixed doubles

References

1989 births
Living people
Chinese para-badminton players
Paralympic badminton players of China
Badminton players at the 2020 Summer Paralympics
Medalists at the 2020 Summer Paralympics
Paralympic medalists in badminton
Paralympic gold medalists for China
21st-century Chinese people